Dupo Community Unit School District 196 is a School District in St. Clair County, Illinois, serving students in Dupo, Illinois.

About
DUSD 196 is a member of the Cahokia Conference, a Prek-12 Sports Conference in Metro East. In 2015, The School District began issuing Dell Laptops to all of its students.

Demographics

List of Schools
Bluffview Elementary School
Dupo Community Junior High
Dupo High School

References

 Buildings and structures in St. Clair County, Illinois
 Education in St. Clair County, Illinois
 School districts in Illinois